Bellville High School is a public high school located in the city of Bellville, Texas in Austin County, United States and classified as a 4A school by the UIL. It is a part of the Bellville Independent School District located in central Austin County. In 2015, the school was rated "Met Standard" by the Texas Education Agency.

Athletics
The Bellville Brahmas compete in these sports  

Baseball
Basketball
Cross Country
Football
Golf
Powerlifting
Softball
Tennis
Track and Field
Volleyball
Soccer

State Titles
Baseball – 
1993(3A)
Girls Track – 
1976(2A), 1978(2A)
Volleyball – 
1984(3A), 1986(3A), 1990(3A), 1991(3A), 1993(3A), 1995(3A), 1996(3A), 1997(3A), 2005(3A)

Notable alumni
Lucas Luetge (born March 24, 1987) is a professional baseball player for the New York Yankees of Major League Baseball.
Emmanuel Sanders (born March 17, 1987) is an American football wide receiver for the Buffalo Bills of the National Football League.

References

External links
 Bellville ISD website

Public high schools in Texas
Schools in Austin County, Texas